The Tauherenikau River, also known as the Tauwharenikau River, is a river of the Wellington Region of New Zealand's North Island. It flows initially southeast from its sources on the slopes of Mount Hector before turning southwest to run down a long valley in the Tararua Range. From the end of the valley it again turns southeast, flowing past the town of Featherston before reaching the northern shore of Lake Wairarapa.

See also
List of rivers of New Zealand

References

Rivers of the Wellington Region
Rivers of New Zealand